Diasemia monostigma, the black wedge pyrale, is a moth of the family Crambidae. It is found in South and East Africa, including islands of the Indian Ocean.

References

Spilomelinae
Moths of Madagascar
Lepidoptera of Zimbabwe
Moths of Réunion
Moths of Sub-Saharan Africa
Moths described in 1913
Lepidoptera of South Africa